Walter Henry "Chief" Aiken (January 31, 1893 – December 14, 1965) was an American football coach, college athletics administrator, and real estate developer.  He served as the head football coach at both Atlanta University and Clark College in Atlanta, Georgia, which later merged to form Clark Atlanta University.  After assisting head football coach Tubby Johnson at Fisk University in 1929, Aiken was hired at the athletic director at Clark in 1930 to succeed Sam B. Taylor.

Aiken was born in Dover, Delaware and was a graduate of Hampton Institute—now known as Hampton University.  He died on December 14, 1965, in Atlanta.

References

External links
 

1893 births
1965 deaths
American construction businesspeople
Fisk Bulldogs football coaches
Clark Atlanta Panthers athletic directors
Clark Atlanta Panthers football coaches
Hampton University alumni
People from Dover, Delaware
African-American coaches of American football
Businesspeople from Delaware
20th-century American businesspeople
20th-century African-American people